Presidential elections were held in Ukraine on 31 October 1999, with a second round on 14 November. The result was a victory for Leonid Kuchma, who defeated Petro Symonenko in the run-off.

Electoral system
At the time of election the population in Ukraine was 50,105,600 with 34,017,400 living in cities. The most districts contained the Donetsk Oblast (23) as the most populous one, the least electoral districts among oblasts were in the Chernivtsi Oblast, only 4. The city of Kyiv had 12 electoral districts and Sevastopol - 2. There also was a special out-of-country district available for voters who at the moment of elections were not available to vote in Ukraine.

Registration
There were 32 individuals who submitted their documents for registration as pretenders on candidate to the President of Ukraine. Out of them 19 pretenders were registered with the Central Election Commission of Ukraine to run for presidential elections, the rest 13 were denied in registration.

Registered candidates
 Oleksandr Bazylyuk, by Slavic Party
 Hennadiy Balashov, by group of voters (Dnipropetrovsk)
 Ivan Bilas, by Congress of Ukrainian Nationalists
 Nataliya Vitrenko, by Progressive Socialist Party of Ukraine
 Mykola Haber, by Patriotic Party of Ukraine
 Yuriy Karmazin, by Motherland Defenders Party
 Vitaliy Kononov, by Party of Greens of Ukraine
 Yuriy Kostenko, by group of voters (Kyiv)
 Leonid Kuchma, by group of voters (Kyiv)
 Yevhen Marchuk, by Bloc "Our President - Yevhen Marchuk!" (Social-Democratic Union, Christian-People's Union, Ukrainian Republican Party, Ukrainian Peasant Democratic Party)
 Oleksandr Moroz, by Socialist Party of Ukraine
 Hryhoriy Novodvorsky, by group of voters (Dashiv, Vinnytsia Oblast)
 Volodymyr Oliynyk, by group of voters (Kirovohrad)
 Vasyl Onopenko, by Ukrainian Social Democratic Party
 Mykhailo Pavlovsky, by group of voters (Khmelnytskyi)
 Oleksandr Rzhavsky, by All-Ukrainian Political Association "One Family"
 Petro Symonenko, by Communist Party of Ukraine
 Oleksandr Tkachenko, by Peasant Party of Ukraine
 Hennadiy Udovenko, by National Movement of Ukraine

Notes:
 Udovenko and Kostenko initially were denied in registration, but on May 21, 1999 both were registered.

Registration denied
 Mykola Havrylov
 Borys Holodyuk, by group of voters (Monastyrets, Lviv Oblast)
 Volodymyr Huba, by group of voter (Kyiv)
 Valentyna Datsenko, by All-Ukrainian Party of Female Initiatives
 Tetyana Zadorozhna, by group of voters (Shakhtarsk)
 Oleh Kalashnikov, by group of voters (Kyiv)
 Valeriy Korotkov, by Women National Party (united)
 Dmytro Korchynsky, by group of voters (Pohoriltsi, Chernihiv Oblast)
 Pavlo Lazarenko, by Hromada
 Oleksandr Pukhkal, by group of voters (Mykolaivka, Kirovohrad Oblast)
 Marian Roketsky, by group of voters (Ivano-Frankivsk)
 Andriy Taranenko, by group of voters (Kyiv)
 Volodymyr Yurchenko, by group of voters (Kyiv)

Candidates
All pretenders were required to collect signatures to become candidates. In the process ten pretenders were not able to gather the required signatures, while six were reinstated on decision of the Supreme Court of Ukraine. Later another two registered candidates withdrew.
 Oleksandr Bazylyuk, initially denied in registration, Bazylyuk was granted candidate status on decision of the Supreme Court of Ukraine of August 11, 1999
 Nataliya Vitrenko
 Mykola Haber, initially denied in registration, Haber was granted candidate status on decision of the Supreme Court of Ukraine of August 9, 1999
 Yuriy Karmazin, initially denied in registration, Karmazin was granted candidate status on decision of the Supreme Court of Ukraine of August 16, 1999
 Vitaliy Kononov, initially denied in registration, Kononov was granted candidate status on decision of the Supreme Court of Ukraine of August 12, 1999
 Yuriy Kostenko
 Leonid Kuchma
 Yevhen Marchuk
 Oleksandr Moroz
 Volodymyr Oliynyk
 Vasyl Onopenko, initially denied in registration, Onopenko was granted candidate status on decision of the Supreme Court of Ukraine of August 6, 1999
 Oleksandr Rzhavsky, initially denied in registration, Rzhavsky was granted candidate status on decision of the Supreme Court of Ukraine of August 10, 1999
 Petro Symonenko
 Oleksandr Tkachenko
 Hennadiy Udovenko

Notes:
 On October 27, 1999 Oliynyk and Tkachenko withdrew from the election campaign.

Kaniv four
Since the summer of 1999 there was a sharp competition among the candidates. Four candidates Yevhen Marchuk, Oleksandr Moroz, Volodymyr Oliynyk (mayor of Cherkasy), and Oleksandr Tkachenko (speaker of Verkhovna Rada) met in Kaniv and called on all candidates to just and honest elections. The "Kaniv Four" had intentions to present a single candidate who would have more chances for success. It however failed to do so and no one else joined them neither. Volodymyr Oliynyk being promoted by Kirovohrad city residents, on October 27 surrendered his candidacy in favor of Yevhen Marchuk, while Oleksandr Tkachenko favored Petro Symonenko (leader of Communist Party of Ukraine).

Conduct
According to historian Serhy Yekelchyk President Kuchma's administration "employed electoral fraud freely" during the election.

Results
In the first round the most oblasts and the out-of-country district were won by Leonid Kuchma. In seven oblasts the top candidate was Petro Symonenko mostly in the centre and south. Oleksandr Moroz managed to become the leader in the more agrarian oriented Poltava and Vinnytsia Oblasts. Nataliya Vitrenko took the peak of the candidate list in the Sumy Oblast.

Notes
 During the election campaign Kuchma was supported by the Bloc "Our Choice – Leonid Kuchma!"<ref>Soskin, O. L. Kuchma at power – Ukraine in decline. Institute of Society Transformation.</ref>

References

Bibliography
 Fritz, D. V. "State-Building: A Comparative Study of Ukraine, Lithuania, Belarus, and Russia". Central European University Press. Budapest 2008. 

External links
 Ukrainian presidential election, 1999. Central Electoral Commission of Ukraine website.
 Handbook on preparation to the Foreign Independent Evaluation (ZNO) on history of Ukraine''. www.history.vn.ua
 Romanyuk, A.S., Skochilias, L.S., and others. Electoral map of Lviv region in inter regional section. Lviv: TsPD, 2010.
 Tantsiura, V. Political history of Ukraine.
 Yulia Tyshchenko, Ukrainian Independent Center of Political Studies.
 1999 Presidential elections. Central Electoral Commission. Kiev 2000
 1999 Presidential elections: how it was. Part 2. Freedom of speech in Ukraine.

Presidential
1999
October 1999 events in Europe
November 1999 events in Europe
Leonid Kuchma